På solsiden (On the Sunny Side) is a Norwegian comedy-drama film from 1956 directed by Edith Carlmar. It stars Arne Lie, Randi Kolstad, Henny Moan, Ellen Isefiær, and Joachim Holst-Jensen. The film is based on Helge Krog's 1927 play of the same name.

Plot
On a warm summer day, the writer Joachim Bris comes to the Riibe estate. He has been invited by Hartvig, the son running the farm. However, not everyone is happy with the visit, which has unexpected consequences for several people in the family. All of them have a part to play when Esther must eventually have a big showdown with those that have always lived "on the sunny side."

Reception and reissue
When the film premiered in 1956, the newspaper Aftenavisen Stavangeren characterized it as "a truly amiable, sunny, and charming comedy." The film was released on DVD  in 2005 by Nordisk Film.

Other
The 1936 Swedish film På Solsidan (On the Sunny Side) was also based on Krog's play. It had a script written by Oscar Hemberg and was directed by Gustaf Molander. The film starred Lars Hanson, Ingrid Bergman, Karin Swanström, and Edvin Adolphson.

Cast
 Arne Lie: landowner Hartvig Riibe
 Ellen Isefiær: Margrethe, Hartvig's mother
 Randi Kolstad: Ester Riibe, Hartvig's wife
 Henny Moan: Wenche, Hartvig's sister
 Joachim Holst-Jensen: Uncle Severin
 Frank Robert: Joakim Bris
 Jan Voigt: Preben Klingberg
 Lalla Carlsen: woman in a boat

Minor roles are also played by Otto Carlmar, Haakon Arnold, Ragnar Olason, Odd Johansen, and Odd Rohde.

References

External links 
 
 Norsk filmografi: På solsiden

1956 films
Norwegian comedy-drama films
1956 comedy-drama films
Films directed by Edith Carlmar
1950s Norwegian-language films
Norwegian black-and-white films
1956 comedy films
1956 drama films